Hat Noppharat Thara–Mu Ko Phi Phi National Park lies in the Ao Nang, Sai Thai, and Pak Nam Sub-districts of Amphoe Mueang Krabi, Krabi Province, Thailand. It is a marine national park. Established in 1983, it is an IUCN Category II protected area with coral reefs, and an area measuring 242,437 rai ~  .

Climate
The park is influenced by tropical monsoon winds resulting in two seasons: the first is a rainy season from May–December and a hot season from January–April. Average temperature ranges from 17-37 degrees Celsius. Average rainfall per year is about 2,231 millimeters, highest in July and lowest in February.

Visitors
From October 2015 to May 2016, 1.168 million tourists visited Hat Noppharat Thara-Mu Ko Phi Phi Marine National Park. Seventy-seven percent, or 900,466, were foreigners. Resulting revenues were 361.91 million baht, according to the Department of National Parks, Wildlife and Plant Conservation.

Gallery

See also
List of national parks of Thailand
List of Protected Areas Regional Offices of Thailand

References

External links
 

National parks of Thailand
Protected areas established in 1983
IUCN Category II
1983 establishments in Thailand
Geography of Krabi province
Tourist attractions in Krabi province
Marine parks
Marine protected areas of Thailand